The Supreme Court of Canada (SCC; , CSC) is the highest court in the judicial system of Canada. It comprises nine justices, whose decisions are the ultimate application of Canadian law, and grants permission to between 40 and 75 litigants each year to appeal decisions rendered by provincial, territorial and federal appellate courts. The Supreme Court is bijural, hearing cases from two major legal traditions (common law and civil law) and bilingual, hearing cases in both official languages of Canada (English and French).

The effects of any judicial decision on the common law, on the interpretation of statutes, or on any other application of law, can, in effect, be nullified by legislation, unless the particular decision of the court in question involves application of the Canadian Constitution, in which case, the decision (in most cases) is completely binding on the legislative branch. This is especially true of decisions which touch upon the Canadian Charter of Rights and Freedoms, which cannot be altered by the legislative branch unless the decision is overridden pursuant to section 33 (the "notwithstanding clause").

History

The creation of the Supreme Court of Canada was provided for by the British North America Act, 1867, renamed in 1982 the Constitution Act, 1867. The first bills for the creation of a federal supreme court, introduced in the Parliament of Canada in 1869 and in 1870, were withdrawn. It was not until 8 April 1875 that a bill was finally passed providing for the creation of a Supreme Court of Canada.

However, prior to 1949, the Supreme Court did not constitute the court of last resort: litigants could appeal to the Judicial Committee of the Privy Council in London. Some cases could bypass the Supreme Court and go directly to the Judicial Committee from the provincial courts of appeal. The Supreme Court formally became the court of last resort for criminal appeals in 1933 and for all other appeals in 1949. The last decisions of the Judicial Committee on cases from Canada were made in the mid-1950s, for cases that had first been heard in a court of first instance prior to 1949.

The increase in the importance of the Supreme Court was mirrored by the numbers of its members; it was established first with six judges, and these were augmented by an additional member in 1927. In 1949, the bench reached its current composition of nine justices.

Prior to 1949, most of the appointees to the court owed their position to political patronage. Each judge had strong ties to the party in power at the time of their appointment. In 1973, the appointment of a constitutional law professor Bora Laskin as chief justice represented a major turning point for the court. Laskin's federalist and liberal views were shared by Prime Minister Pierre Trudeau, who recommended Laskin's appointment to the court, but from that appointment onward appointees increasingly either came from academic backgrounds or were well-respected practitioners with several years' experience in appellate courts.

The Constitution Act, 1982, greatly expanded the role of the court in Canadian society by the addition of the Canadian Charter of Rights and Freedoms, which greatly broadened the scope of judicial review. The evolution from the court under Chief Justice Brian Dickson (1984–90) through to that of Antonio Lamer (1990–2000) witnessed a continuing vigour in the protection of civil liberties. Lamer's criminal law background proved an influence on the number of criminal cases heard by the Court during his time as chief justice. Nonetheless, the Lamer court was more conservative with Charter rights, with only about a 1% success rate for Charter claimants.

Lamer was succeeded as the chief justice by Beverley McLachlin in January 2000. She was the first woman to hold that position. McLachlin's appointment resulted in a more centrist and unified court. Dissenting and concurring opinions were fewer than during the Dickson and Lamer courts. With the 2005 appointments of puisne justices Louise Charron and Rosalie Abella, the court became the world's most gender-balanced national high court with four of its nine members being female. Justice Marie Deschamps' retirement on 7 August 2012 caused the number to fall to three; however, the appointment of Suzanne Côté on 1 December 2014 restored the number to four. Her successor as the chief justice is Richard Wagner.

Along with the German Federal Constitutional Court and the European Court of Human Rights, the Supreme Court of Canada is among the most frequently cited courts in the world.

Canadian judiciary

The structure of the Canadian court system is pyramidal, a broad base being formed by the various provincial and territorial courts whose judges are appointed by the provincial or territorial governments. At the next level are the provincial and territorial superior trial courts, where judges are appointed by the federal government. Judgments from the superior courts may be appealed to a still higher level, the provincial or territorial superior courts of appeal.

Several federal courts also exist: the Tax Court, the Federal Court, the Federal Court of Appeal, and the Court Martial Appeal Court. Unlike the provincial superior courts, which exercise inherent or general jurisdiction, the jurisdiction of federal courts and provincially appointed provincial courts are limited by statute. In all, there are over 1,000 federally appointed judges at various levels across Canada.

Appellate process
The Supreme Court rests at the apex of the judicial pyramid. This institution hears appeals from the provincial courts of last resort, usually the provincial or territorial courts of appeal, and the Federal Court of Appeal, although in some matters appeals come straight from the trial courts, as in the case of publication bans and other orders that are otherwise not appealable.

In most cases, permission to appeal must first be obtained from the court. Motions for leave to appeal to the court are generally heard by a panel of three of its judges and a simple majority is determinative. By convention, this panel never explains why it grants or refuses leave in any particular case, but the court typically hears cases of national importance or where the case allows it to settle an important issue of law. Leave is rarely granted, meaning that for most litigants, provincial courts of appeal are courts of last resort. But leave to appeal is not required for some cases, primarily indictable criminal cases in which at least one appellate judge (on the relevant provincial court of appeal) dissented on a point of law, and appeals from provincial reference cases.

A final source of cases is the power of the federal government to submit reference cases. In such cases, the Supreme Court is required to give an opinion on questions referred to it by the Governor in Council (the Cabinet). However, in many cases, including the most recent same-sex marriage reference, the Supreme Court has declined to answer a question from the Cabinet. In that case, the court said it would not decide if same-sex marriages were required by the Charter of Rights and Freedoms, because the government had announced it would change the law regardless of its opinion, and subsequently did.

Constitutional interpretation
The Supreme Court thus performs a unique function. It can be asked by the Governor-in-Council to hear references considering important questions of law. Such referrals may concern the constitutionality or interpretation of federal or provincial legislation, or the division of powers between federal and provincial spheres of government. Any point of law may be referred in this manner. However, the Court is not often called upon to hear references. References have been used to re-examine criminal convictions that have concerned the country as in the cases of David Milgaard and Steven Truscott.

The Supreme Court has the ultimate power of judicial review over Canadian federal and provincial laws' constitutional validity. If a federal or provincial law has been held contrary to the division of power provisions of one of the various constitution acts, the legislature or parliament must either live with the result, amend the law so that it complies, or obtain an amendment to the constitution. If a law is declared contrary to certain sections of the Charter of Rights and Freedoms, Parliament or the provincial legislatures may make that particular law temporarily valid again against by using the "override power" of the notwithstanding clause. In one case, the Quebec National Assembly invoked this power to override a Supreme Court decision (Ford v Quebec (AG)) that held that one of Quebec's language laws banning the display of English commercial signs was inconsistent with the Charter. Saskatchewan has also used it to uphold its labour laws. This override power can be exercised for five years, after which time the override must be renewed or the decision comes into force.

In some cases, the court may stay the effect of its judgments so that unconstitutional laws continue in force for a period of time. Usually, this is done to give Parliament or a legislature sufficient time to enact a new replacement scheme of legislation. For example, in Reference Re Manitoba Language Rights, the court struck down Manitoba's laws because they were not enacted in the French language, as required by the Constitution. However, the Court stayed its judgment for five years to give Manitoba time to re-enact all its legislation in French. It turned out five years was insufficient so the court was asked, and agreed, to give more time.

Constitutional questions may, of course, also be raised in the normal case of appeals involving individual litigants, governments, government agencies or Crown corporations. In such cases the federal and provincial governments must be notified of any constitutional questions and may intervene to submit a brief and attend oral argument at the court. Usually the other governments are given the right to argue their case in the court, although on rare occasions this has been curtailed and prevented by order of one of the court's judges.

Sessions

The Supreme Court sits for 18 weeks of the year beginning the first Monday of October and usually runs until the end of June and sometimes into July. Hearings only take place in Ottawa, although litigants can present oral arguments from remote locations by means of a video-conference system. Hearings are open to the public. Most hearings are taped for delayed telecast in both of Canada's official languages. When in session, the court sits Monday to Friday, hearing two appeals a day. A quorum consists of five members for appeals, but a panel of nine justices hears most cases.

On the bench, the chief justice of Canada or, in his or her absence, the senior puisne justice, presides from the centre chair with the other justices seated to his or her right and left by order of seniority of appointment. At sittings, the justices usually appear in black silk robes but they wear their ceremonial robes of bright scarlet trimmed with Canadian white mink in court on special occasions and in the Senate at the opening of each new session of Parliament.

Counsel appearing before the court may use either English or French. The judges can also use either English or French. There is simultaneous translation available to the judges, counsel and to members of the public who are in the audience.

The decision of the court is sometimes – but rarely – rendered orally at the conclusion of the hearing. In these cases, the court may simply refer to the decision of the court below to explain its own reasons. In other cases, the court may announce its decision at the conclusion of the hearing, with reasons to follow. As well, in some cases, the court may not call on counsel for the respondent, if it has not been convinced by the arguments of counsel for the appellant. In very rare cases, the court may not call on counsel for the appellant and instead calls directly on counsel for the respondent. However, in most cases, the court hears from all counsel and then reserves judgment to enable the justices to write considered reasons. Decisions of the court need not be unanimous – a majority may decide, with dissenting reasons given by the minority. Justices may write separate or joint opinions for any case.

A puisne justice of the Supreme Court is referred to as The Honourable Mr/Madam Justice and the chief justice as Right Honourable. At one time, judges were addressed as "My Lord" or "My Lady" during sessions of the court, but it has since discouraged this style of address and has directed lawyers to use the simpler "Justice", "Mr Justice" or "Madam Justice". The designation "My Lord/My Lady" continues in many provincial superior courts and in the Federal Court of Canada and Federal Court of Appeal, where it is optional.

Every four years, the Judicial Compensation and Benefits Commission makes recommendations to the federal government about the salaries for federally appointed judges, including the judges of the Supreme Court. That recommendation is not legally binding on the federal government, but the federal government is generally required to comply with the recommendation unless there is a very good reason to not do so. The chief justice receives $370,300 while the puisne justices receive $342,800 annually.

Appointment of justices

Justices of the Supreme Court of Canada are appointed on the advice of the prime minister. The provinces and Parliament of Canada have no formal role in such appointments, sometimes a point of contention.

The Supreme Court Act limits eligibility for appointment to persons who have been judges of a superior court or members of the bar for ten or more years. Members of the bar or superior judiciary of Quebec, by law, must hold three of the nine positions on the Supreme Court of Canada. This is justified on the basis that Quebec uses civil law, rather than common law, as in the rest of the country. As explained in the reasons in Reference Re Supreme Court Act, ss. 5 and 6, sitting judges of the Federal Court and Federal Court of Appeal cannot be appointed to any of Quebec's three seats. By convention, the remaining six positions are divided in the following manner: three from Ontario; two from the western provinces, typically one from British Columbia and one from the prairie provinces, which rotate among themselves (although Alberta is known to cause skips in the rotation); and one from the Atlantic provinces, almost always from Nova Scotia or New Brunswick.

In 2006, an interview phase by an  committee of members of Parliament was added. Justice Marshall Rothstein became the first justice to undergo the new process. The prime minister still has the final say on who becomes the candidate that is recommended to the governor general for appointment to the court. The government proposed an interview phase again in 2008, but a general election and minority parliament intervened with delays such that the Prime Minister recommended Justice Cromwell after consulting the leader of the Opposition.

As of August 2016, Prime Minister Justin Trudeau opened the process of application to change from the above-noted appointment process. Under the revised process, "[any] Canadian lawyer or judge who fits specified criteria can apply for a seat on the Supreme Court, through the Office of the Commissioner for Federal Judicial Affairs." Functional bilingualism is now a requirement.

Justices were originally allowed to remain on the bench for life, but in 1927 a mandatory retirement age of 75 was instituted. They may choose to retire earlier, but can only be removed involuntarily before that age by a vote of the Senate and House of Commons.

Current members

The current chief justice of Canada is Richard Wagner. He was appointed to the court as a puisne judge on 5 October 2012 and appointed chief justice, 18 December 2017. The nine justices of the Wagner Court are:

Length of tenure

Andromache Karakatsanis has had the longest tenure of any of the current members of the court, having been appointed in October 2011. Michelle O'Bonsawin has the briefest tenure, having been appointed  ago. The length of tenure for the other justices are: Suzanne Côté, ; Russell Brown, ; Malcom Rowe, ; Sheilah Martin, ; Nicholas Kasirer, ; and Mahmud Jamal, .

Rules of the court
The Rules of the Supreme Court of Canada are located on the laws-lois.justice.gc.ca website, as well as in the Canada Gazette, as SOR/2002-216 (plus amendments), made pursuant to subsection 97(1) of the Supreme Court Act. Fees and taxes are stipulated near the end.

Law clerks
Since 1967, the court has hired law clerks to assist in legal research. Between 1967 and 1982, each puisne justice was assisted by one law clerk and the chief justice had two. From 1982, the number was increased to two law clerks for each justice. Currently, each justice has up to four law clerks.

Law clerks conduct research, draft bench memoranda, and assist in drafting judgments, as well as any other research duties assigned by the law clerk's judge such as drafting speeches or articles.

Law clerks are usually newly-trained lawyers who have been both admitted to the bar in their respective provinces and completed their articles. Clerkships at the Supreme Court are prestigious positions within the Canadian legal community and are highly competitive, with each position receiving thousands of applications. Successful applicants usually have an excellent academic record and prior service on law reviews/journals during law school, along with an extensive record of legal publications. Akin to the United States, former Supreme Court clerks are highly sought after by private law firms for their rare experience, with many earning a substantial signing bonus above regular associates.

Building

The Supreme Court of Canada Building, located just west of Parliament Hill at 301 Wellington Street on a bluff high above the Ottawa River in downtown Ottawa, is home to the Supreme Court of Canada. It also contains two courtrooms used by the Federal Court and the Federal Court of Appeal.

The building was designed by Ernest Cormier. The building is known for its Art Deco decorative details, including two candelabrum-style fluted metal lamp standards that flank the entrance, and the marble walls and floors of the grand interior lobby contrasting with the châteauesque roof. Construction began in 1939, with the cornerstone laid by Queen Elizabeth, consort to King George VI and later known as the Queen Mother. The court began hearing cases in the new building by January 1946.

In 2000, it was named by the Royal Architectural Institute of Canada as one of the top 500 buildings produced in Canada during the last millennium.

Canada Post Corporation issued a 'Supreme Court of Canada, Ottawa' stamp on 9 June 2011 as part of the Architecture Art Déco series.

Two flagstaffs have been erected in front of the building. A flag on one is flown daily, while the other is hoisted only on those days when the court is in session. Also located on the grounds are several statues, notably:

Prime Minister Louis St. Laurent by Elek Imredy 1976
Two statues by Canadian sculptor Walter S. Allward:
Statue of Veritas (Truth)
Statue of Justitia (Justice)

Inside there are busts of several chief justices:

John Robert Cartwright 1967–1970
Bora Laskin 1973–1983
Brian Dickson 1984–1990
Antonio Lamer 1990–2000

They were all sculpted by Kenneth Phillips Jarvis (1927–2007), Q.C., RCA, a retired Under Treasurer of the Law Society of Upper Canada.

Behind the building, along the cliff edge was once the home of hat maker R.J. Devlin at 41 Cliff Street, but demolished to make way for the court building.

The court was housed previously in two other locations in Ottawa:
Railway Committee Room and a number of other committee rooms at the Centre Block on Parliament Hill 1876–1889 – later used as official meeting space for the federal Opposition Party Room was destroyed in fire and replaced with room built in 1916.
Old Supreme Court building on Bank Street 1889–1945 – demolished in 1955 and used as parking for Parliament Hill

See also

Supreme Court of Canada cases
List of supreme courts by country

References

Further reading

External links

Supreme Court of Canada website
Supreme Court of Canada Library Catalogue
Opinions of the Supreme Court of Canada
searchable database of SCC decisions (to 1948, with select older cases) via CanLII
Supreme Court of Canada from www.marianopolis.edu
Explore the Virtual Charter—Charter of Rights website with video, audio and the Charter in more than twenty languages
The appointment process and reform
SCC building from official site
SCC Building 

 
Art Deco architecture in Canada
Courthouses in Canada
Canadian appellate courts
Federal government buildings in Ottawa
Canada
Ernest Cormier buildings
Art Deco courthouses
1875 establishments in Canada
Buildings and structures completed in 1946
Courts and tribunals established in 1875